La Salle (Valdôtain:  (locally )) is a town and comune in the Aosta Valley region of north-western Italy.

The Châtelard Castle is in the town.

Economy 
The economy of La Salle is, today, mainly based on tourism, during summer and winter seasons. Nevertheless, it retains some handicraft and agricultural activities. In particular the viticulture with the production of the Vallée d'Aoste Blanc de Morgex et de La Salle a DOC white wine made from the Prié blanc grape.

References 

Cities and towns in Aosta Valley